The Malaysia Institute for Supply Chain Innovation (MISI) is a supply chain post-graduate school located in Shah Alam, Malaysia. The school was launched as a joint initiative between the Massachusetts Institute of Technology (MIT) and the Government of Malaysia on March 22, 2011. MISI is an accredited university with the Ministry of Higher Education, Malaysia, and offers post-graduate and executive education programs in supply chain management. All post-graduate programs currently offered are MQA certified.

History 
MISI was formed in March 2011 as an academic institute focused on Supply Chain Management with three goals: deliver world-class graduate and executive education, conduct applied research that meets the highest international standards of academic rigor, and actively engage industry to create and disseminate cutting edge supply chain knowledge. MISI admitted its first batch of graduate students for its flagship 10-month, residential Master of Science in Supply Chain Management program. Organizations such as InvestKL considered MISI to be a partner for attracting foreign companies to invest in the Greater Kuala Lumpur region. In the first ten years, nearly 50 multinational, regional, and local companies partnered with MISI for applied research projects and executive education in supply chain management and procurement.

MISI was a member of the MIT Global SCALE Network until 2021, when it was reorganized under Universiti Teknologi MARA (UiTM) and decided to end its affiliation with MIT.

MIT Global SCALE Network 
The MIT Global SCALE Network is an international alliance of research and educational organizations, dedicated to the development and dissemination of global innovation in supply chain and logistics. The SCALE Network and its parent MIT Center for Transportation & Logistics are consistently ranked number-1 in the world for graduation education in Supply Chain Management, by ranking publications such as QS World University Rankings and Eduniversal.

The MIT Global SCALE Network contained six centers until MISI's exit in 2021. They are MIT-Center for Transportation and Logistics, USA; Zaragoza Logistics Center, Spain; Center for Latin-American Logistics Innovation, Colombia; Malaysia Institute for Supply Chain Innovation, Malaysia (until 2021); Luxembourg Center for Logistics and Supply Chain Management, Luxembourg; and Ningbo Supply Chain Innovation Institute, China.

Campus Location 
MISI is located in Bukit Jelutong, Shah Alam. Shah Alam is an industrial city, located about 40 minutes from Kuala Lumpur, the capital of Malaysia.

Educational programs 
 MIT-Malaysia Master of Science in Supply Chain Management (MSCM)
 Part-Time Master of Science in Supply Chain Management (PSCM)
 Executive Education in Supply Chain Management, Procurement, Retail Supply Chain and Scenario Planning

Governance and Leadership 
Dr. Mahender Singh was the founding CEO and Rector of MISI. Prof. Dr. David Gonsalvez took over the two roles in 2015 at the end of Dr. Singh's tenure and led MISI until August 2021. Dr. Sabariah Jemali, MISI's Academic Registrar since its founding, took over as the acting CEO upon Prof. Gonsalvez's retirement.

The Chairman of MISI is YBhg. Tan Sri Dato' Sri Dr. Mohd Nadzmi Mohd Salleh, chairman, NADICORP Holdings Sdn Bhd. Other board members include:
 YBhg. Prof. Ts. Dr. Haji Mohamad Kamal Haji Harun, Deputy Vice-Chancellor (Academic and International) Universiti Teknologi MARA (UiTM)
 YBhg. Prof. Dr. Mohd Cairul Iqbal Mohd Amin, Deputy Director General, Department of Higher Education, Ministry of Higher Education
 YBhg. Prof. Emeritus Datuk Ir. Dr. Mohd Azraai Kassim, Vice-Chancellor Universiti Teknologi MARA (UiTM)
 Prof. Dr. Yossi Sheffi, Director, MIT Center for Transportation and Logistics Massachusetts Institute of Technology (MIT), USA
 Prof. Dr. David Gonsalvez, chief executive officer & Rector Malaysia Institute for Supply Chain Innovation, Malaysia

References 

 Official website of the Malaysia Institute for Supply Chain Innovation
 http://www.thestar.com.my/news/education/2011/07/24/mit-endorsement-for-malaysia/
 http://www.thestar.com.my/news/education/2012/07/29/pact-for-excellence/

2011 establishments in Malaysia
Schools in Malaysia
Massachusetts Institute of Technology